Iqbal Hossain ( – 6 December 2019) was a Bangladeshi freedom fighter and politician from Munshiganj. He was a member of Jatiya Sangsad representing the Munshiganj-2 constituency during 1988–1990.

Biography
Hossain took part in the Liberation War of Bangladesh. He was the commander of Louhajong unit of Mujib Bahini in 1971. He also served as the vice chairman of Muktijoddha Sangsad. He was elected as a member of the Jatiya Sangsad from Munshiganj-2 in 1988.

Hossain died on 6 December 2019 in Apollo Hospital, Dhaka.

References

1950s births
2019 deaths
People from Munshiganj District
People of the Bangladesh Liberation War
4th Jatiya Sangsad members
Date of birth missing
Place of birth missing